Trbinc is a settlement immediately west of Mirna in the Municipality of Mirna in southeastern Slovenia. The area is part of the traditional region of Lower Carniola. The municipality is now included in the Southeast Slovenia Statistical Region.

An Iron Age settlement has been identified near the settlement.

References

External links

Trbinc on Geopedia

Populated places in the Municipality of Mirna